In electromagnetism, Fleming's right-hand rule  (for generators) shows the direction of induced current when a conductor attached to a circuit moves in a magnetic field.  It can be used to determine the direction of current in a generator's windings.

When a conductor such as a wire attached to a circuit moves through a magnetic field, an electric current is induced in the wire due to Faraday's law of induction.  The current  in the wire can have two possible directions.  Fleming's right-hand rule gives which direction the current flows.

The right hand is held with the thumb, index finger and middle finger mutually perpendicular to each other (at right angles), as shown in the diagram.

 The thumb is pointed in the direction of the motion of the conductor relative to the magnetic field.
 The first finger is pointed in the direction of the magnetic field. By convention, it's the direction from North to South magnetic pole.
 Then the second finger represents the direction of the induced or generated current within the conductor (from + to −, the terminal with lower electric potential to the terminal with higher electric potential, as in a voltage source)

The bolded letters in the directions above give a mnemonic way to remember the order. Another mnemonic for remembering the rule is the initialism "FBI", standing for Force (or otherwise motion), B the symbol for the magnetic field, and I the symbol for current. The subsequent letters correspond to subsequent fingers, counting from the top: thumb → F; first finger → B; second finger → I.

There is also a Fleming's left-hand rule (for electric motors). The appropriately handed rule can be recalled from the letter "g", which is in "right" and "generator".

These mnemonics are named after British engineer John Ambrose Fleming, who invented them.

An equivalent version of Fleming's right-hand rule is the left-hand palm rule.

See also
Fleming's left-hand rule for motors

References

External links
 Diagrams at magnet.fsu.edu
 Diagrams and exercises

Science mnemonics
Electromagnetism

zh:佛來明右手定則